Byrum may refer to:

 Byrum (surname)
 Byrum Fred Saam, Jr., known as By Saam, sportscaster
 Byrum, Denmark, the main town of the Danish island Læsø
 "Byrum", the name given to the alien antagonists of Stephen King's novel Dreamcatcher

See also
 Byrum's raukar, a group of stacks near the village of Byrum, Öland